The 2022 Wake Forest Demon Deacons football represented Wake Forest University during the 2022 NCAA Division I FBS football season. The Demon Deacons played their home games at Truist Field at Wake Forest in Winston–Salem, North Carolina, and competed as members of the Atlantic Coast Conference. They were led by head coach Dave Clawson, in his ninth season.

Schedule
Wake Forest announced its 2022 football schedule on January 12, 2022. The 2022 schedule will consist of seven home games and five away games in the regular season. The Demon Deacons will host ACC foes Clemson, Boston College, North Carolina, and Syracuse and will travel to Florida State, Louisville, NC State and Duke.

The Demon Deacons will host three of their non-conference opponents, VMI from the Division I FCS, Liberty from the FBS Independents and Army, also from the FBS Independents. They will visit Vanderbilt from the SEC.

Game summaries

VMI

at Vanderbilt

Liberty

No. 5 Clemson

at No. 23 Florida State

Army

Boston College

at Louisville

at No. 22 NC State

No. 15 North Carolina

Syracuse

at Duke

vs. Missouri (Gasparilla Bowl)

Rankings

Coaching staff

References

Wake Forest
Wake Forest Demon Deacons football seasons
Gasparilla Bowl champion seasons
Wake Forest Demon Deacons football